Thomas Michael Shanahan (May 5, 1934 – December 27, 2011) was a United States district judge of the United States District Court for the District of Nebraska.

Early life and education
Born in Omaha, Nebraska, Shanahan received a Bachelor of Arts degree from the University of Notre Dame in 1956 and a Bachelor of Laws from Georgetown University Law Center in 1959. He was in private practice in Ogallala, Nebraska from 1959 to 1983.

Judicial career

Nebraska Supreme Court
Shanahan was a judge on the Nebraska Supreme Court, to which he was appointed March 24, 1983, to fill a vacancy created by the death of Judge Lawrence M. Clinton. Shanahan served in that capacity until 1993.

Federal judicial service
On August 6, 1993, Shanahan was nominated by President Bill Clinton to a new seat on the United States District Court for the District of Nebraska created by 104 Stat. 5089. He was confirmed by the United States Senate on November 20, 1993, and received his commission on November 22, 1993. He assumed senior status on May 5, 2004 but stopped hearing cases on February 1, 2007. He died on December 27, 2011.

Sources

1934 births
2011 deaths
Justices of the Nebraska Supreme Court
Judges of the United States District Court for the District of Nebraska
United States district court judges appointed by Bill Clinton
Lawyers from Omaha, Nebraska
University of Notre Dame alumni
Georgetown University Law Center alumni
People from Ogallala, Nebraska
20th-century American judges
21st-century American judges